The Mating of Marcus is a 1924 British silent romance film directed by W. P. Kellino and starring David Hawthorne, George Bellamy and Moore Marriott. It was based on a novel by Mabel Grundy.

Cast
 David Hawthorne – Marcus Netherby 
 George Bellamy – Mr. Chester 
 Moore Marriott – Reverend Cheffins 
 Mollie Johnson – Valerie Westmacott
 Pauline Cartwright – Vivi Chester 
 Beatrice Ford – Naomi Chester

References

Bibliography
 Low, Rachael. History of the British Film, 1918–1929. George Allen & Unwin, 1971.

External links

1924 films
British romance films
British silent feature films
1920s romance films
Films directed by W. P. Kellino
Stoll Pictures films
Films shot at Cricklewood Studios
Films based on British novels
British black-and-white films
1920s English-language films
1920s British films